Martin O'Brien (27 August 1885 – 24 December 1958) was an Irish hurler. His championship career with the Tipperary senior team lasted from 1906 until 1912.

Biography

Raised in Drombane near Thurles, County Tipperary, O'Brien was the fifth of twelve children born to James and Bridget O'Brien. He was educated locally and later worked as a shopkeeper in Thurles.

O'Brien won All-Ireland Championship medals with the Tipperary senior team in 1906 and 1908, and also won three Munster Championship medals. As a member of the Thurles Sarsfields club, O'Brien won six County Championship medals. He played his last game in 1917.

O'Brien died from bladder cancer on 24 December 1958.

Honours

Thurles Sarsfields
Tipperary Senior Hurling Championship (6): 1904, 1906, 1907, 1908, 1909, 1911

Tipperary
All-Ireland Senior Hurling Championship (2): 1906, 1908
Munster Senior Hurling Championship (3): 1906, 1908, 1909

References

1885 births
1958 deaths
Thurles Sarsfields hurlers
Tipperary inter-county hurlers
All-Ireland Senior Hurling Championship winners